Marhaura (also spelt as Marhowrah) is a town and an administrative sub-divisional area in Saran district in the Indian state of Bihar. It is Marhaura (Vidhan Sabha constituency). Marhaura was the industrial hub of Saran in the 1980s,.

Geography
It has an average elevation of 52 metres (170 feet). Marhaura is 26 km from the nearest city, Chhapra, and has good connectivity of transportation by rail and road.

Demographics
 India census, Marhaura had a population of 24,534. Males constitute 82% of the population and females 68%. Marhaura has an average literacy rate of 42%, lower than the national average of 59.5%: male literacy is 54%, and female literacy is 29%. In Marhaura, 19% of the population is under 6 years of age.

Cultural buildings
There is a Shakti Peetha temple, Gadhdevi Maa and an ancient temple of lord Shiva located at Shilhauri, that has many faithful followers. Both the temples are situated either side of railway station and 2 km from the railway station.

Rail Diesel Locomotive Engine Factory

Former Rail Minister Lalu Prasad had proposed a rail diesel engine factory in Marhaura, Saran however nothing happened after announcement. Finally  land has been acquired in 2016-17 and construction work has started and chances are construction will be completed in 2018, The contract to develop the factory is  being awarded to the American company GE.

References

Cities and towns in Saran district